The 29th International 500-Mile Sweepstakes Race was held at the Indianapolis Motor Speedway on Friday, May 30, 1941. The start of the race was delayed due to a fire that swept through the garage area on race morning. No persons were injured, but one car in the field was destroyed. The race rolled off with only 31 cars, and ran to its scheduled distance. This would be the final "500" prior to the United States involvement in WWII. It was not known at the time, but it would be the final race organized by Speedway president Eddie Rickenbacker, and due to the war, the race would not be held again until 1946.

Race details
Sam Hanks was injured in a practice crash the day before the race and withdrew. Rather than elevate the first alternate to the starting field, Hanks was credited with 33rd place.

Garage area fire
On the morning of the race a fire broke out in the garage area. George Barringer's revolutionary rear-engined car was destroyed. At the time, the car was being refueled (with gasoline). In a nearby garage, another car which was owned by Joel Thorne was being worked on with a welder. The fumes caught fire from the sparks of the welding, and a huge fire broke out which burned down about a third of the southern bank of garages. The start of the race was delayed by a couple hours, and fire fighters had trouble getting to the Speedway to put out the blaze due to the heavy race day traffic. Barringer's car was withdrawn, and he was credited with 32nd finishing position. With Sam Hanks and Barringer out, the race lined up with only 31 cars.

Various equipment, tools, parts, and other supplies were lost in the fire. Two other cars that did not qualify for the race were reported to have been damaged. However, all of the other cars that qualified for the race were safely evacuated, and no injuries were reported. The fire was put out, but the site smoldered throughout the day, and smoke continued to rise even after the race had safely started.

Wilbur Shaw
Two-time defending champion (and three-time winner overall) Wilbur Shaw crashed while leading on lap 152, and failed in his bid to become the first driver to three-peat at the Indianapolis 500 (and first four-time winner). As of 2022, no driver has ever won the Indianapolis 500 three consecutive years. Going down the mainstretch, the car lost control, and hit the outside wall, rupturing the gas tank. Shaw was drenched with fuel, and suffered a back injury which left him immobile for several minutes. Despite the fuel spill, the fuel did not ignite, and Shaw was brought to safety by the medical staff.

It is believed that the morning garage fire had an effect on Shaw's efforts. At some point before the race, Shaw's crew was preparing his tires for race day, and used chalk to write notes on the spare tires. One particular wheel was determined to be out of balance, and rather than being discarded, it was labeled in chalk with the words "USE LAST". However, the firefighters' water hoses are believed to have washed off the chalk message. Shaw inadvertently took on the bad wheel during a pit stop, which caused his crash.

Shaw never drove another competitive lap at the Speedway, although he did participate in a special private tire test at the Speedway during World War II.

Floyd Davis & Mauri Rose
Floyd Davis was the starting driver for the #16 car. On lap 72, Davis came in for a pit stop, and was relieved by Mauri Rose. Rose had started the race in another car and dropped out earlier. Car owner Lou Moore was apparently unsatisfied with Davis' performance thus far in the race, and ordered Rose to take over. Rose charged up the standings and took the lead in the #16 car, and went on to win. Both drivers were credited as "co-winners," similar to what occurred in the 1924 race. This marked the last time that one car would carry two drivers to victory at Indy.

Box score

Alternates
First alternate: Louis Durant

Failed to Qualify

Shorty Cantlon
Ira Hall (#38)
René Le Bègue (#21)
Bill Lipscomb  (#57)
Roy Russing  (#22)
Jean Trévoux  (#24)

Other Notes
Speedway president Eddie Rickenbacker did not attend the race, and instead listened to it on the radio. He was recovering from injuries suffered in a near-fatal plane crash a few months before the race.

See also
 1941 AAA Championship Car season

References

Indianapolis 500 races
Indianapolis 500
Indianapolis 500
1941 in American motorsport
May 1941 sports events